Aaldonk is a small area with just a dozen houses; it is part of the municipality of Gennep (in the province of Limburg, the Netherlands). Most of the area is agricultural and it is closely linked to the nearby village of Ottersum and on the other side to 'de Panoven', another agricultural area.

Populated places in Limburg (Netherlands)
Articles lacking sources from June 2009
All articles lacking sources
Gennep